Alexandre Astruc (13 July 1923 – 19 May 2016) was a French film critic and film director.

Biography
Before becoming a film director he was a journalist, novelist and film critic. His contribution to the auteur theory centers on his notion of the caméra-stylo or "camera-pen" and the idea that directors should wield their cameras like writers use their pens.

In 1994 he was awarded the René Clair Award for his whole body of film work.

Selected filmography
(s) indicates films also co-scripted by Astruc
1949: Ulysse ou Les mauvaises rencontres also known as Aller et retour, a short film; Astruc also wrote the scenario
1952: The Crimson Curtain (s) (Le rideau cramoisi)
1952: La Putain respectueuse
1955: Les Mauvaises rencontres (s)
1957: Amour de poche
1958: Une vie (s)
1960: La proie pour l'ombre (s)
1962: 
1964: The Pit and the Pendulum (Le Puits et le Pendule)
1966:  (s)
1968:  (s)

Publications
1945: Les Vacances, Gallimard
1975: Ciel de cendres, Le Sagittaire
1975: La tête la première, Olivier Orban
1977: Le Serpent jaune, Gallimard
1979: Quand la chouette s'envole, Gallimard
1982: Le Permissionnaire, Éditions de la Table ronde, Paris
1989: Le roman de Descartes, Éditions Balland
1992: Du stylo à la caméra et de la caméra au stylo: Écrits (1942–1984), Éditions de l'Archipel
1993: L'autre versant de la colline, Écriture
1994: Évariste Galois, Groupe Flammarion
1997: Le Siècle à venir, Éditions Trédaniel
2015: Le plaisir en toutes choses (with Noël Simsolo), Éditions Neige/Écriture

References

Bibliography
Raymond Bellour, Alexandre Astruc, Paris, Seghers, Collection Cinéma d'aujourd'hui, 1963.
Philippe François, « Alexandre Astruc », in Patrick Cabanel and André Encrevé (dir.), Dictionnaire biographique des protestants français de 1787 à nos jours, tome 1 : A-C, Les Éditions de Paris Max Chaleil, Paris, 2015, (p. 105)

External links

Alexandre Astruc on NewWaveFilm.com

Foco - Revista de Cinema, special edition devoted to Alexandre Astruc

Writers from Paris
1923 births
2016 deaths
French film directors
French male screenwriters
French screenwriters
20th-century French novelists
20th-century French male writers
20th-century French male actors
Roger Nimier Prize winners